Asen Ivanov Bukarev is a Bulgarian football manager and former footballer. He is currently working as a manager of Vitosha Bistritsa.

Bukarev was honoured as Footballer of the Year of Varna for 2002.

Career

Clubs
On the club level, Bukarev has played for PFC Haskovo (1997–1998), Akademik Sofia (1998), CSKA Sofia (1998–2002), Cherno More Varna (2002–2003) and Levski Sofia (2003–2006). He ended his career as a 27-year-old at the end of the 2005-2006 season, because of a serious injury from which he recovered, though the medical advice was not to risk continuing to train in accordance with the requirements for professionals.

International career
Bukarev earned his first cap with Bulgaria on 24 January 2001 in the 2:0 win against Mexico in a friendly match and made a total of 4 appearances for his country. For the Bulgaria U-21 he played in 18 matches, scoring 3 goals.

Coaching career
In June 2009 he had been appointed as an assistant coach of Velislav Vutsov in Slavia Sofia.On 31 May 2010 Bukarev left Slavia Sofia after the departure of manager Velislav Vutsov. On 4 August 2017, following the departure of Nikolay Mitov, Asen Bukarev was appointed as caretaker manager of Levski Sofia. He moved back to assistant role on 8 August, following the appointment of Delio Rossi as manager. In late December 2019, he was appointed as manager of Vitosha Bistritsa.

Personal
Bukarev's father, Ivan, and his brother, Dimitar, are both employed within the field of medicine. His mother, Lidiya, is a historian-archivist.

Honours

CSKA Sofia
 Bulgarian Cup: 1998-99

Levski Sofia
 A PFG: 2005-06
 Bulgarian Cup: 2004-05

References

External links
 
 
 Profile at Levskisofia.info

Living people
Bulgarian footballers
Bulgarian football managers
PFC CSKA Sofia players
PFC Cherno More Varna players
PFC Levski Sofia players
1979 births
First Professional Football League (Bulgaria) players
PFC Slavia Sofia managers
Association football midfielders
Footballers from Sofia
Bulgaria international footballers